Jorma Petteri Korhonen (born 23 March 1968) is a Finnish judoka. He competed in the men's lightweight event at the 1992 Summer Olympics.

Achievements

References

External links
 

1968 births
Living people
Finnish male judoka
Olympic judoka of Finland
Judoka at the 1992 Summer Olympics